Anis Mojgani (Persian: انیس مژگانی) (born June 13, 1977) is an American spoken word poet, visual artist and musician based in Portland, Oregon. Mojgani has been characterized as a "geek genius" with "fiercely hopeful word arias."

Early life and education 
Mojgani was born and raised in New Orleans, Louisiana. He later moved to Georgia and graduated from the Savannah College of Art and Design with a Bachelor of Fine Arts in sequential art and a Master of Fine Arts in performing arts.

Career
Over the course of his career, Mojgani has been a member of several poetry slam teams. He was also a member of 2007's Solomon Sparrow's Electric Whale Revival and 2008's Junkyard Ghost Revival, both of which featured poets Buddy Wakefield and Derrick C. Brown as actively-touring members.

Mojgani won back-to-back titles in the National Individual Poetry Slam in 2005 and 2006, was interviewed in 2006 on KUOW-FM's The Beat, and was in the documentary Slam Planet: War of the Words. In 2007 Mojgani was on HBO's Def Poetry Jam and placed 2nd in Poetry Slam, Inc.'s 2007 Individual World Poetry Slam and won first place at 2007 World Cup Poetry Slam held in Bobigny, France as part of the French National Slam Championships among 16 National Poetry Slam Champions. and published and cover in the Summer 2007 edition of RATTLE.

Mojgani cites several influences: "Jeffrey McDaniel, Richard Brautigan, Charles Bukowski, Gregory Corso, Kerouac, MF DOOM, Aesop Rock, Robert Rauschenberg, Basquiat, Chris Ware, Frank Miller, Saul Williams, Walt Whitman, Savannah, Georgia, New York City, New Orleans, being broke, being a hermit, Shoot the Piano Player, the Baháʼí writings and history."
Mojgani was named in the book Words in Your Face: A Guided Tour Through Twenty Years of the New York City Poetry Slam as one of the poets who "saw success" after leaving New York City's notoriously competitive poetry slam community.

His book The Feather Room was a 2011 National Book Award nominee. Mojgani is featured performing a live poem in "Heartbreak Dreamer", the first song on Mat Kearney's 2015 album Just Kids.

On April 27, 2020, it was announced that Oregon Governor Kate Brown had appointed Mojgani as the 10th Oregon poet laureate.

Personal life 
Mojgani is a member of the Baháʼí Faith and participated in the Black Men's Gathering initiative across 2003–2010 including trips for the religion to Brazil and a youth leadership meeting in the U.S.

Books
 In the Pockets of Small Gods (Write Bloody Publishing, 2018)
 The Pocketknife Bible: The Poems and Art of Anis Mojgani (Write Bloody Publishing, 2015)
 Songs From Under the River: A collection of early and new work (Write Bloody Publishing, 2013)
 The Feather Room (Write Bloody Publishing, 2011)
 Over the Anvil We Stretch (Write Bloody Publishing, 2008)

See also
 Poetry Slam, Inc.

References

External links
 Anis Mojgani's Website
 Anis Mojgani's Tumblr
 Anis Mojgani's Instagram
 Anis Mojgani Performs "Shake the Dust"
 Anis Mojgani's LiveJournal
 Anis Mojgani's MySpace
 Audio of "Shake the Dust," "Cradle," "Invincible" and "Here I Am" (among others) on Indiefeed Performance Poetry Channel
 Badilisha Poetry Exchange Profile

American Bahá'ís
Living people
1977 births
Bahá'í poets
Slam poets
Artists from Portland, Oregon
Savannah College of Art and Design alumni
20th-century Bahá'ís
21st-century Bahá'ís